The 2016 season was the 119th season of competitive football in Sweden. Sweden was participating in qualifying for the 2018 FIFA World Cup after UEFA Euro 2016.

Domestic results

Men's football

2016 Allsvenskan

2017 Allsvenskan playoffs 

Halmstads BK won 3–2 on aggregate.

2016 Superettan

2016 Superettan play-offs 

Norrby IF won 4–2 on aggregate.

Syrianska FC won 5–1 on aggregate.

National teams

Sweden men's national football team

UEFA Euro 2016

Friendlies and qualifications

Sweden men's national under-23 football team

2016 Summer Olympics

Friendlies

Sweden men's national under-21 football team

2017 UEFA European Under-21 Championship qualification

Sweden men's national under-17 football team

2016 UEFA European Under-17 Championship

Sweden women's national football team

2016 Summer Olympics

Friendlies and qualifications

Sweden women's national under-19 football team

2016 FIFA U-20 Women's World Cup

References

 
Seasons in Swedish football